Muriel Day (born 11 January 1942) is an Irish singer. Born in Newtownards, County Down, she was the first singer from Northern Ireland to represent the Republic of Ireland in the Eurovision Song Contest, performing at the 1969 contest. She was also the first woman to perform for Ireland, which had been competing since 1965.

After making her name in the Irish showband circuit, and making an uncredited appearance as a dance hall singer in the British film Billy Liar (1963), Day was chosen as Ireland's Eurovision contestant with the song "The Wages of Love" in 1969. Though the song was a great hit in Ireland, it only finished seventh internationally, in a year with four winners. As a result of her performance, however, she was offered the chance to record with Peter Warne, producing the northern soul hit "Nine Times out of Ten".

After moving to Canada in 1971, where she continued her career, Day eventually took up medicine and became a laser therapist. She returned to Belfast in the 1990s, where she has been performing regularly. As a guest on RTÉ's The Late, Late Show Eurosong 2015 episode, broadcast on 27 February 2015, Day announced she was about to release her first album.  however, this album hasn't been released.

References

External links

The Wages of Love on YouTube
 

Living people
Musicians from County Down
Irish women singers
Eurovision Song Contest entrants for Ireland
Eurovision Song Contest entrants of 1969
People from Newtownards
Northern soul musicians
Irish expatriates in Canada
1942 births
People in alternative medicine